The 2016 Southeastern Conference women's basketball tournament was a postseason women's basketball tournament for the Southeastern Conference held at Jacksonville Veterans Memorial Arena in Jacksonville, Florida from March 2 through 6, 2016. South Carolina won the SEC Women's Tournament for the 2nd year in a row and earns an automatic bid to the 2016 NCAA Women's Division I Basketball Tournament.

Seeds

Schedule

Bracket

See also
2016 SEC men's basketball tournament

References

External links
 

2015–16 Southeastern Conference women's basketball season
SEC women's basketball tournament
Sports competitions in Jacksonville, Florida
SEC Women's Basketball